Walton Stadium may refer to:
Audrey J. Walton Stadium (Columbia, Missouri), field of the Missouri Tigers track and field team
Joe Walton Stadium, field of the Robert Morris University Colonials football team
Audrey J. Walton Stadium (Central Missouri)  field of the University of Central Missouri football team